Certus may refer to:

 Certus Gearless Company, a British automotive company
 Pegas Certus, a Czech paraglider model
 Cogswell & Harrison Certus, a British hunting and target magazine rifle family